Evgenia Vlasova (born 8 April 1978 in Kyiv, Ukrainian SSR, Soviet Union) is a Ukrainian singer-songwriter.

Biography
Her parents were artistically inclined (mother was an actress, father was a singer). In 1994 Vlasova entered the R. Glier State Higher Music College, graduating in 1998. In that same year, she entered the Queen of the Song international competition in Rimini, Italy singing Musyka dusha moya (Music of my soul). She won the grand prize in this event.

Also in 1998, Vlasova won several Ukrainian music popularity competitions such as the Song of the Year festival and the 21st Century's Hope nomination. In 1999 she wrote "Wind of Hope". Dmitriy Kostiuk signed on as her manager in that same year.

In November 2001, the Wind of Hope full-length album was released. This album was followed a string of music videos; "Severnoye siyaniye (Northern Lights)", "O Tebe (About You)", "Budu silneye (I'll be strong)", and "Plach obo mne (Cry about me)".

In 2004, Vlasova gave birth to a daughter named Nina and stepped briefly out of her singing career to devote her full attention to her new career as a mother.

Vlasova re-entered the music world in 2005, this time teaming up with Andru Donalds (a member of the group Enigma). The result of their work was four duets and a music video called "Limbo".

Personal life 
Vlasova is divorced from her producer Dmitry Kostyuk in 2008. They have a daughter together named Nina Kostyuk (born 4 August 2004).

Illness 
In 2009 Vlasova was diagnosed with ovarian cancer. As of March 2010 she underwent a surgery and three courses of chemotherapy and is feeling better now.

Albums

Veter nadezhdy (Ветер надежды)
1. Ya – zhyvaja reka (Я – живая река)
2. Son (Сон)
3. Zyma (Зима)
4. Narysuju (Нарисую)
5. O tebe (О тебе – About You)
6. Dysko (Диско)
7. Veter nadezhdy (Ветер надежды – Wind of Hope)
8. Tam, gde lubov' (Там, где любовь)
9. Severnoe syjanye (Северное сияние – Northern Lights)
10. Krasnoe solnce (Красное солнце)
11. Ne zabuvaj! (Не забувай)

Wind of Hope
1. Cry in the night
2. My wonderland
3. Love is a crazy game (ft. Andru Donalds)
4. Only you
5. Limbo (ft. Andru Donalds)
6. River of life
7. One night lover (ft. Andru Donalds)
8. Northern Lights
9. Gonna be stronger
10. Wind of hope (ft Andru Donalds)
11. Limbo (rmx) (ft Andru Donalds)

Синергия (Synergy)
1. Лавина любви (Lavina lubvi – Avalanche of Love)
2. На двоих сердце одно… (Na dvoik cyertse adno – Two hearts as one)
3. На краю небес (Na Krayu nibyes – At the edge of Heaven)
4. Отношения (Otnoshyeniya – Relationships)
5. Планета №2 (Planeta No. 2 – Planet #2)
6. Нет, я не боюсь (Nyet, ya ne boyus – No, I'm not afraid)
7. Полетим в небо (Polyetim v nebo – Fly to the sky)
8. Сердце (Cyertse – Heart)
9. Шоу-тайм (Shou-Taim – Show-Time)
10. В каждом биении сердца (V kazdom biyenii certsa – Every heartbeat)
11. Убегаю (Oobegayu – Escape)
12. Шоу-тайм RMX (Shou-Taim RMX – Show-Time RMX)

Singles
Live River
Severnoye siyaniye (Northern Lights)
O Tebe (About You),
Budu silneye (I'll be strong)
Wind of hope (ft. Andru Donalds)
Plach obo me (Cry about me)
Limbo (ft. Andru Donalds)
Ya budu (I will)
Шоу-тайм (Show-Time) No. 17

Most of the singles are in Russian and English.

References

1978 births
Living people
Ukrainian pop singers
Musicians from Kyiv
21st-century Ukrainian women singers